Belén District may refer to:

 Peru
 Belén District, Maynas, in Maynas province, Loreto region
 Belén District, Sucre, in Sucre province, Ayacucho region
 Costa Rica
 Belén District, Carrillo, in Carrillo Canton, Guanacaste province
 Belén de Nosarita District, in Nicoya Canton, Guanacaste province